Olivet United Methodist Church, Parsonage and School is a historic church in the vicinity of Riversburg, Tennessee in Giles County.

It was built in 1871 and added to the National Register in 1984.

References
https://npgallery.nps.gov/GetAsset?assetID=e5b6ced4-fa6a-45c4-84b1-11529724bbcd

United Methodist churches in Tennessee
Churches on the National Register of Historic Places in Tennessee
Churches completed in 1871
19th-century Methodist church buildings in the United States
Churches in Giles County, Tennessee
National Register of Historic Places in Giles County, Tennessee